You Can't Go Home Again is an album by trumpeter Chet Baker which was recorded in 1977 and released on the Horizon label. In 2000 the album was rereleased as a double CD with additional tracks from The Best Thing for You (1989) along with previously unreleased tracks and alternate takes.

Reception 

The Allmusic review by Heather Phares calls it "one of Baker's most important latter-day albums".

Track listing

Original 1977 LP release
 "Love For Sale" (Cole Porter) – 12:58
 "Un Poco Loco" (Bud Powell) – 9:20
 "You Can't Go Home Again" (Don Sebesky) – 5:43
 "El Morro" (Sebesky) – 13:44

2000 Double CD release
 "Love for Sale" (Porter) – 13:03
 "Un Poco Loco" (Powell) – 9:26
 "You Can't Go Home Again" (Sebesky) – 5:47
 "El Morro" (Sebesky) – 14:18
 "The Best Thing for You" (Irving Berlin) – 4:20 	
 "I'm Getting Sentimental Over You/You've Changed" (George Bassman, Ned Washington/ Bill Carey, Carl Fischer) – 6:05 
 "Oh, You Crazy Moon" (Jimmy Van Heusen, Johnny Burke) – 3:38 
 "How Deep Is the Ocean?" (Berlin) – 5:49 
 "If You Could See Me Now" (Tadd Dameron, Carl Sigman) – 4:43 
 "You Can't Go Home Again" [alternate take] (Sebesky) – 6:31 
 "I'm Getting Sentimental Over You/You've Changed" [alternate take] (Bassman, Washington/Carey, Fischer) – 6:08 
 "El Morro" (Sebesky) – 17:13 
 "Out of Our Hands" (Richie Beirach) – 10:36 
 "Broken Wing" (Beirach) – 5:21 
 "Paradox" (Beirach) – 6:09 
 "Blues" (Traditional) – 7:59 
 "The Best Thing for You" [alternate take] (Berlin) – 4:28 
 "How Deep Is the Ocean?" [alternate take] (Berlin) – 5:45 
 "If You Could See Me Now" [alternate take] (Dameron, Sigman) – 5:02 
 "El Morro" [incomplete take] (Sebesky) – 13:13

Personnel 
Chet Baker – trumpet
Hubert Laws – flute, bass flute, piccolo 
Paul Desmond – alto saxophone 
Michael Brecker – tenor saxophone 
John Campo – bassoon 
Don Sebesky, Kenny Barron – electric piano
Richie Beirach – electric piano, clavinet
John Scofield – guitar
Gene Bertoncini – acoustic guitar
Ron Carter – bass
Alphonso Johnson – electric bass
Tony Williams – drums
Ralph MacDonald – percussion 
String section arranged and conducted by Don Sebesky
Charles Libove, David Nadien, Diana Halprin, Harold Kohon, Marvin Morgenstern, Matthew Raimondi, Max Ellen, Paul Gersham, Rochelle Abramson – violin
Alan Shulman, Charles McCracken, Jesse Levy – cello

References 

Chet Baker albums
1977 albums
Horizon Records albums